Liisa Anneli Jaakonsaari (née Ollakka; born 2 September 1945) is a Finnish politician who served as a Member of the European Parliament (MEP) from 2009 until 2019. She is a member of the Social Democratic Party, part of the Progressive Alliance of Socialists and Democrats.

Jaakonsaari was a city councillor in Oulu from 1972 until 1995. She was also a member of the Finnish parliament from 1979 until 2009, when she was elected as a Member of the European Parliament (MEP). Jaakonsaari was the Minister of Labour in Paavo Lipponen's first cabinet (1995–1999).

Unlike her party, Jaakonsaari advocated NATO membership already before the 2022 Russian invasion of Ukraine.

References

External links
 Official Homepage
 Jaakonsaari on the official website of the Finnish Parliament 

1945 births
Living people
People from Oulu
Social Democratic Party of Finland politicians
Ministers of Labour of Finland
Members of the Parliament of Finland (1979–83)
Members of the Parliament of Finland (1983–87)
Members of the Parliament of Finland (1987–91)
Members of the Parliament of Finland (1991–95)
Members of the Parliament of Finland (1995–99)
Members of the Parliament of Finland (1999–2003)
Members of the Parliament of Finland (2003–07)
Members of the Parliament of Finland (2007–11)
Social Democratic Party of Finland MEPs
MEPs for Finland 2009–2014
MEPs for Finland 2014–2019
21st-century women MEPs for Finland
Women government ministers of Finland
20th-century Finnish women politicians
Women members of the Parliament of Finland